Robert L. Hogsett (January 29, 1941 – December 5, 1984) was an American professional basketball player and coach. He played collegiately for the Tennessee Volunteers and went undrafted in the 1966 NBA draft. Hogsett played professionally for parts of two seasons for the Lansing Capitals of the North American Basketball League (NABL), the Detroit Pistons of the National Basketball Association (NBA) and the Pittsburgh Pipers of the American Basketball Association (ABA). Hogsett served as the head coach of the Francis Marion Patriots men's basketball team from 1970 to 1973 and amassed a 10–56 record.

In 1983, Hogsett was hired by Virginia Tech to work as an administrator at the Veterinary Medical Teaching Hospital, where he was responsible for non-clinical hospital operations. On December 5, 1984, Hogsett was confronted by Virginia Tech carpenter Louis Dowdy outside the veterinary school administration building. Dowdy fired one shot into Hogsett's chest before he turned the gun on himself. Hogsett was taken to the Montgomery County Hospital, where he was pronounced dead.

References

External links

College statistics

1941 births
1984 deaths
American men's basketball players
Basketball players from Tennessee
College men's basketball head coaches in the United States
Deaths by firearm in Virginia
Detroit Pistons players
Francis Marion Patriots men's basketball coaches
Male murder victims
People murdered in Virginia
Pittsburgh Pipers players
Power forwards (basketball)
Tennessee Volunteers basketball players
Undrafted National Basketball Association players
Murder–suicides in Virginia